Daljit Singh may refer to:

 Daljit Singh (footballer) (born 1979), Indian footballer
 Daljit Singh (politician), Indian politician
 Daljit Singh (cricketer, born 1935) (1935–2009), Indian cricketer
 Daljit Singh (cricketer, born 1937), Indian cricketer
 Daljit Singh (cricketer, born 1940s), Indian cricketer and pitch curator
 Daljeet Singh (born 1995), Hong Kong cricketer
 Daljit Singh (ophthalmologist) (1934–2017), Indian ophthalmologist